Abdihakim Dahir Said is a Somali police officer. He was the Chief of the Somali Police Force, having been appointed to the position on 13 May 2013 by Prime Minister Abdiweli Sheikh Ahmed. Said succeeded Shareif Sheikhuna Maye in office. Said's term ended on 9 July 2014, when he was replaced with Mohamed Sheikh Ismail. In April 2017, he was again appointed as the Chief of Somali Police.

References

Somalian police chiefs
Living people
Year of birth missing (living people)